Mường Chà is a rural district of Điện Biên province in the Northwest region of Vietnam. As of 2012 the district had a population of 39,456. The district covers an area of 1,199.42 km². The district capital lies at Mường Chà.

On 25 August 2012, the western portion of the district was carved out to form Nậm Pồ district.

Geography

Administrative divisions
Mường Chà has 12 administrative units, including 1 town and 11 communes:

 Mường Chà town
 Huổi Lèng
 Huổi Mí
 Hừa Ngài
 Ma Thì Hồ
 Mường Mươn
 Mường Tùng
 Na Sang
 Nậm Nèn
 Pa Ham
 Sa Lông
 Sá Tổng

References

Districts of Điện Biên province
Điện Biên province